Maryland has 281 named islands within its many waters and waterways, including the Atlantic ocean; the Chesapeake bay and its many tributary tidal rivers, creeks and bays; as well as within larger whitewater rivers like the upper Potomac.

These Islands are relatively permanent, although some are disappearing on the scale of a few centuries, like Smith Island in the Chesapeake Bay.

There are also a number of unnamed islands in Maryland, many of which are very temporary in nature, lasting only a few years or decades, both in the tidal environment and also in Maryland's larger whitewater rivers. These come and go due to the effect of storms.

This is a list of named islands of Maryland.

See also
 List of islands on the Potomac River

Sources
Maryland State Archives

Maryland

Islands